João Marcos Ferreira Andrade (born 25 May 1985), known as Zâmbia, is a Brazilian former professional footballer who played as a right-back.

Zâmbia previously played for Boavista F.C.

References

External links

1985 births
Living people
Association football fullbacks
Brazilian footballers
Boavista F.C. players
Sertanense F.C. players
C.D. Mafra players